Alpinia globosa, round Chinese cardamom, is a species of ginger native to East Asia. It was first described by João de Loureiro, and got its current name from Paul Paulus Fedorowitsch Horaninow.

References

globosa
Plants described in 1862